The Balaton was a Hungarian microcar made by Székesfehérvári Motorjavitó Vállalat based in the central Hungarian town of Székesfehérvár, which began production in 1956.

It was powered by a 250 cc  Pannonia motorcycle engine. The rubber suspension was developed from an idea of Ernő Rubik Sr., father of Ernő Rubik who later became famous for the Rubik's cube. The roof and doors were in one piece and hinged to give access to the interior.

The same company also made the Alba Regia microcar with which the Balaton shared most of its mechanical parts.

External links
 Hungarian Microcars of the 50s with pictures

Car manufacturers of Hungary
Defunct motor vehicle manufacturers of Hungary
B
Cars of Hungary
Cars introduced in 1956
Manufacturing companies established in 1956
1956 establishments in Hungary